Adi Konstantinos (born 9 November 1994) is an Israeli professional footballer who plays for Ahva Reineh.

References

External links

Profile page in Maccabi Haifa website

1994 births
Israeli Jews
Israeli settlers
Living people
Israeli footballers
Maccabi Haifa F.C. players
Hapoel Acre F.C. players
Hapoel Petah Tikva F.C. players
Hapoel Jerusalem F.C. players
Maccabi Netanya F.C. players
Hapoel Katamon Jerusalem F.C. players
Hapoel Ashkelon F.C. players
Olympiakos Nicosia players
Hapoel Ironi Baqa al-Gharbiyye F.C. players
Maccabi Herzliya F.C. players
Israeli people of Greek-Jewish descent
Footballers from Ma'ale Adumim
Israeli Premier League players
Liga Leumit players
Expatriate footballers in Cyprus
Israeli expatriate sportspeople in Cyprus
Israel under-21 international footballers
Association football midfielders